The View from the Floor is the 2005 debut album by Slow Dazzle.

Track listing
"Fleur de Lis" (Shannon McArdle) – 3:13
"A Welfare State" (Timothy Bracy) – 3:32
"Wedding Dance" (McArdle) – 4:02
"The Prosecution Rests" (Bracy) – 4:55
"The Extent of My Remarks" (Bracy) – 3:27
"The View from the Floor" (McArdle) – 2:17
"Anthem" (Leonard Cohen) – 6:32
"Now or Never or Later" (Bracy) – 4:24

Personnel
Performed by Shannon McArdle, Timothy Bracy, and Peter Langland-Hassan
Recorded by Peter Langland-Hassan
Mastered by Vin Scialla at Avenue A Studios
Layout and design by Dave Ewald

2005 debut albums